The Sinai rosefinch (Carpodacus synoicus) is a species of finch in the family Fringillidae. It is found in the Sinai Peninsula and the Negev region of the Middle East, within the borders of Egypt, Israel, Jordan, Palestine, and Saudi Arabia. Its natural habitat is hot deserts. The pale rosefinch is sometimes considered a subspecies.

References

Sinai rosefinch
Birds of North Africa
Birds of the Middle East
Sinai rosefinch
Taxonomy articles created by Polbot